This is a list of transcontinental former countries, i.e. countries which covered land on two or more continents, including islands associated with a continent other than the one where the country was based. The examples below are listed in chronological order with the number of continents covered in parentheses and the country's primary continent listed first. When a timespan is included, it is the time period in which the country was transcontinental.

BC
 Ancient Egyptian Empire (2) – Africa, Asia,
 Hyksos (2) – Asia, Africa (circa 1648–1540 BC)
 Kingdom of Kush (2) – Africa, Asia (occupied portions of Edom and Judah circa 901 BC)
 Sabaeans (2) – Asia, Africa
 Cimmerians (2) – Europe, Asia (late 8th century BC) [map]
 Assyria (2) – Asia, Africa (671–612 BC) [map]
 Neo-Babylonian Empire (2) – Asia, Africa (567–539 BC)
 Achaemenid Empire (3) – Asia, Europe, Africa [map]
 Carthage (2) – Africa, Europe
 Alexander the Great (3) – Europe, Asia, Africa (334–323 BC) [map]
 Ptolemaic Kingdom (3) – Africa, Asia, [map] Europe (at its peak) [map]
 Lysimachian Kingdom (2) – Europe, Asia (306–281 BC) [map]
 Seleucid Empire (2) – Asia, Europe (281 BC [map] and 196–191 BC [map])
 Roman Empire (3) – Europe, Asia, Africa [map]

AD 1–AD 500
 Sarmatians (2) – Europe, Asia [map]
 Kingdom of Aksum (2) – Africa, Asia[map]
 Himyarite Kingdom (2) – Asia, Africa
 Palmyrene Empire (2) – Asia, Africa (260–273)
 Hunnic Empire (2) – Europe, Asia [map]
 Byzantine Empire (3) – Europe, Asia, Africa [map]
 Western Roman Empire (2) – Europe, Africa (395–476) [map]
 Vandal Kingdom (2) – Europe, Africa [map]
 Ostrogoths (2) – Europe, Africa

500–1000
 Sabirs (2) – Europe, Asia
 Sassanid Empire (3) – Asia, Africa, Europe (618–641) [map]
 First Turkic Khaganate (2) – Asia, Europe
 Islamic Caliphate
 Rashidun Caliphate (2) – Asia, Africa (639–661) [map]
 Umayyad Caliphate (3) – Asia, Africa, Europe (661–750) [map]
 Abbasid Caliphate (3) – Asia, Africa, Europe
 Alanian Empire (2) – Europe, Asia [map]
 Khazar Empire (2) – Europe, Asia
 Emirate of Córdoba (2) – Europe, Africa
 Pechenegs (2) – Europe, Asia [map]
 Shailendra dynasty (2) – Asia, Oceania
 Kingdom of Kakheti (2) – Asia, Europe
 Kingdom of Abkhazia (2) – Asia, Europe
 Aghlabid Emirate (2) – Africa, Europe (827–909)
 Tulunid Emirate (2) – Africa, Asia (877–904) [map]
 Sajid Emirate of Azerbaijan (2) – Asia, Europe
 Fatimid Caliphate (3) – Africa, Asia, [map] Europe [map]
 Rus (2) – Europe, Asia (at its peak during the Caspian expedition of 913) [map]
 Caliphate of Córdoba (2) – Europe, Africa
 Ikhshidids (2) – Africa, Asia (935–969) [map]

1000–1450
 Sallarid Emirate of Azerbaijan (2) – Asia, Europe
 Kalbid Emirate of Sicily (2) – Europe, Africa
 Georgian Empire (2) – Asia, Europe [map]
 Almoravid Empire (2) – Africa, Europe [map]
 Seljuqs (2) – Asia, Europe [map]
 Pisa (3) – Europe, Asia, Africa [map]
 Kediri Empire (2) – Asia, Oceania [map]
 Chola Empire (2) – Asia, Oceania (at its peak circa 1050) [map]
 Kingdom of Sicily (2) – Europe, Africa
 Almohad Empire (2) – Africa, Europe
 Kingdom of Jerusalem (2) – Asia, Africa (1164 and 1167) [map]
 Ayyubid Caliphate (2) – Asia, Africa (1169–1250) [map]
 Shirvanshah Empire (2) – Asia, Europe
 Latin Empire (2) – Europe, Asia (1204–1261) [map]
 Venice (2) – Europe, Asia [map]
 Second Bulgarian Empire (2) – Europe, Asia (at its peak) [map]
 Khwarezmian Empire (2) – Asia, Europe (at its peak)
 Mongol Empire (2) – Asia, Europe [map] (largest empire of contiguous land ever)
 Golden Horde (2) – Europe, Asia [map]
 Empire of Nicaea (2) – Asia, Europe [map]
 Mamluk Empire (2) – Africa, Asia
 Majapahit Empire (2) – Asia, Oceania [map]
 Ilkhanate (2) – Asia, Europe (1255–1335)
 Genoese Empire (2) – Europe, Asia[map]
 Aragonese Empire (2) – Europe, Africa [map][map]
 Marinid Sultanate (2) – Africa, Europe (1294–1344) [map]
 Ottoman Empire (3) – Asia, Europe, Africa [map]
 Buginese Empire (2) – Oceania (including northern Australia,) Asia
 Timurid Empire (2) – Asia, Europe
 Nogai Horde Empire (2) – Asia, Europe
 Castilian Empire (2) – Europe, Africa [map]
 Kara Koyunlu Empire (2) – Asia, Europe [map]
 Kingdom of Norway (872–1397) (2) – Europe, North America [map]

1450–1700
 Portuguese Empire (6) – Europe, Asia, Africa, North America, South America, Oceania [map][map] (from 1808 to 1821, its capital was in Rio de Janeiro)
 Mahra Sultanate (2) – Asia, Africa [map]
 Spanish Empire (6) – Europe, Asia, Africa, North America, South America, Oceania [map]
 Kingdom of Denmark-Norway (4) – Europe, Asia, North America, Africa [map]
 German Empire (4) – Europe, South America, [map] Asia, [map] Africa [map]
 Iberian Union Empire (6) – Europe, Asia, Africa, North America, South America, Oceania (1580–1640) [map]
 British Empire (6) – Europe, Asia, Africa, North America, South America, Oceania. [map]
 Dutch Empire (6) – Europe, Asia, Africa, North America, South America, Oceania [map]
 French Empire (6) – Europe, Asia, Africa, North America, South America, Oceania [map]
 Scotland (2) – Europe, North America (1621–1631) [map]
 Swedish Empire (3) – Europe, North America, [map] [map] Africa [map]
 Courland (3) – Europe, Africa, South America (1651–1689) (a dependency of Poland–Lithuania) [map]
 Knights of Malta (3) – Europe, Africa, North America (1530–1551 and 1651–1665)
 Brandenburg-Prussia (3) – Europe, Africa, [map][map] North America [map] (1682–1721)

Since 1700
 British Empire (7) – (English Empire until 1707) Asia, Oceania, Africa, Europe, South America, North America, Antarctica
 Omani Empire (2) – Asia, Africa (from 1840 to 1856, Said bin Sultan had the capital in Stone Town, Zanzibar)
 Kingdom of Piedmont-Sardinia (2) – Europe, Africa (1714–1718)
 Russian Empire (3) – Europe, Asia, North America [map]
 United States of America (5) – North America, Africa (1810–1814), [map] Asia (1898-1945), Oceania, South America (1898–1979) [map][map]
 Argentina (5) – South America, Antarctica, Africa (1810-1815), North America (occupied California from November 23 to November 29, 1818), Asia (occupied Manila from 31 January to 30 March 1818)
 Mexico (2) - North America, Oceania
 Chile (3) - South America, Antarctica, Oceania
 Ecuador (2) - South America, Oceania
 Portugal (3) - Europe, Africa, North America
 Kingdom of the Two Sicilies (2) – Europe, Africa (1816–1860) [map]
 Kingdom of Italy (3) – Europe, Africa (1861–1889) Asia[map]
 German Empire (4) – Europe, Africa, Oceania, Asia (1884–1919) [map]
 Belgium (2) – Europe, Africa (1908–1962) [map]
 Denmark (4) – Europe, North America, Asia, Africa [map]
 Japanese Empire (3) – Asia, Oceania (1898–1945), North America (1943) [map][map]
 Norway (2) – Europe, Antarctica [map]
 France (7) – Europe, Africa, Asia, North America, South America, Oceania, Antarctica (1830–1962)
 Commonwealth of Australia (3) – Oceania, Asia, Antarctica[map]
 Union of South Africa (1948–1961) and Republic of South Africa (2) – Africa, Antarctica (if the Prince Edward Islands are considered Antarctic islands)
 United Kingdom of Portugal, Brazil and the Algarves (5) – Europe, South America, Africa, Asia, Oceania
 Uzbek Khanate (2) – Asia, Europe
 Ak Koyunlu Empire (2) – Asia, Europe [map]
 Khanate of Sibir (2) – Asia, Europe [map]
 Astrakhan Khanate (2) – Europe, Asia
 Safavid Empire (2) – Asia, Europe[map]
 Crimean Khanate (2) – Europe, Asia (at its peak)
 Grand Duchy of Moscow [map] and Tsardom of Russia (2) – Europe, Asia
 Kalmyk Khanate (2) – Asia, Europe[map]
 Kingdom of Bali (2) – Asia, Oceania [map]
 Afsharid Empire (2) – Asia, Europe (1736–1747)
 Kazakh Khanate (2) – Asia, Europe
 Quba Khanate (2) – Europe, Asia (1747–1806)
 Kingdom of Kartl-Kakheti (2) – Asia, Europe (1762–1801)
 Qajar Empire (2) – Asia, Europe (1794–1813)[map]
 Later Egyptian Empire (3) – Africa, Asia, Europe  (1803–1807 and 1833–1882) [map]
 United Provinces of New Granada (2) – South America, North America (1810–1816)
 Gran Colombia (2) – South America, Central America (1819–1831) [map]
 Republic of the New Granada (1831–1858) and Granadine Confederation (1858–1863) (2) – South America, Central America [map]
 Greece (2) – Europe, Asia (1920 – 1923) [map] [map]
 Alash Orda (2) – Asia, Europe (December 1917 – May 1920)
 Transcaucasian Democratic Federative Republic (2) – Asia, Europe (February 24 – May 28, 1918) [map]
 Mountainous Republic of the Northern Caucasus (2) – Europe, Asia (May 11, 1918 – June 1920)
 Azerbaijan Democratic Republic (2) – Asia, Europe (May 28, 1918 – April 28, 1920) [map]
 Democratic Republic of Georgia (2) – Asia, Europe (May 28, 1918 – February 25, 1921) [map]
 Centrocaspian Dictatorship (2) – Asia, Europe (August 1 – September 15, 1918)
 Russian SFSR (2) – Europe, Asia (November 1917 – December 1991) [map]
 Soviet Union (2) – Europe, Asia (December 1922 – December 1991) [map]
 West Indies Federation (2) – North America, South America (1958–1962) [map]
 United Arab Republic [map] and United Arab States (2) – Africa, Asia (1958–1961)
 Protectorate of South Arabia (1963–1967), People's Republic of South Yemen (1967–1970), and People's Democratic Republic of Yemen (1970–1990) (2) – Asia, Africa
 Federation of Arab Republics (2) – Africa, Asia (1972–1977) [map]

See also
 List of medieval great powers
 List of Bronze Age states
 List of Classical Age states
 List of former sovereign states
 List of empires
 List of Iron Age states
 List of former monarchies
 List of largest empires
 List of states during Late Antiquity
 Middle Eastern empires

References

Historical countries
Transcontinental